Lehsain (also spelled Al-Hussayn and Al Hussain) is an abandoned village in Qatar located in the municipality of Al-Shahaniya. The area is enclosed by a dense cluster of trees. It is close to Zekreet.

Archaeology
Numerous Neolithic settlements have been uncovered on Qatar's west coast in the Zekreet Peninsula and Dukhan region. During the British archaeological expedition of Qatar in 1973–74 led by Beatrice de Cardi, Neolithic-era stone cutters were found in Lehsain. They closely resemble other tools belonging to the Mousterian industry, but archaeologist G. H. Smith of the British expedition suggested that this industry could be unique to Qatar.

An archaeological site dating to more recent times is Qasr Lehsain, an abandoned fort constructed to secure the local well known as Bir Lehsain.

References

Al-Shahaniya
Archaeological sites in Qatar